GM 3500 engine may refer to:

 GM High Value engine, Chevrolet 60 degree V6 3.5 engine
 DOHC LX5, Oldsmobile V6
 Vortec 3500, straight-5